Peter Kalischer (December 25, 1915 – July 5, 1991) was an American journalist best known for his reporting of the early stages of the Vietnam War in the 1960s as a television correspondent for CBS News. He won the Overseas Press Club award in 1963 for his reporting during the Buddhist crisis that led to the fall of President Ngo Dinh Diem of South Vietnam. In 1968, while covering the Tet Offensive, he had dinner on the rooftop restaurant of the Caravelle Hotel with Walter Cronkite who was preparing a special report on the war and helped to convince him that the war could not be won militarily, that a stalemate was inevitable. From 1966 to 1978, Kalischer was the Paris correspondent and bureau chief for CBS News. He covered the Korean War, writing multiple articles about it.

Kalischer later became a professor of communications at Loyola University, a position he held until 1982.

Bibliography
Incomplete - to be updated

Articles

References

External links 
Obituary from The New York Times

20th-century American journalists
American television reporters and correspondents
American war correspondents
American war correspondents of the Vietnam War
American male journalists
Journalists from California
The New Yorker people
Loyola University New Orleans faculty
1915 births
1991 deaths